Narol can refer to:

Narol, Poland
Narol, a trade name for the psychoactive drug Buspirone